Italy was represented by 73 athletes (44 men and 29 women) at the 2010 European Athletics Championships held in Barcelona, Spain. It is the third most important team selection, after those of Munich 2002 and Göteborg 2006. The standard-bearer will be Antonietta Di Martino.

Medalists

Medals awarded years later after doping cases
Incerti, third at the finish line, won gold medal after the disqualification of first two athletes two years later. Živilė Balčiūnaitė of Lithuania originally won the marathon and was awarded the gold medal, but was disqualified for doping after she tested positive for testosterone. Nailiya Yulamanova of Russia originally came second, and was set to be upgraded to gold winner after Živilė Balčiūnaitė was disqualified. However, in July 2012, Yulamanova was also disqualified for doping, as her results from 20 August 2009 onwards were annulled due to abnormalities in her biological passport profile. Anna Incerti (gold), Tetyana Filonyuk (silver) and Isabellah Andersson (bronze) received the medals by mail.

Participants

See also
 Italy national athletics team

References

External links 
 Participants list

2010
Nations at the 2010 European Athletics Championships
European Athletics Championships